Siget (Serbian Cyrillic: Сигет) is a village located in the Novi Kneževac municipality, in the North Banat District of Serbia. It is situated in the Autonomous Province of Vojvodina. The village has a Serb ethnic majority (73.27%) with a significant Hungarian minority (25.50%) and its population numbering 247 people (2002 census).

Name
In Serbian the settlement is known as Siget (Сигет), and in Hungarian as Sziget. Former Serbian name for this settlement was Mali Siget (Мали Сигет). Mali Siget means "little Siget", while name Veliki Siget (Велики Сигет, meaning: "big Siget") was used for neighbouring uninhabited area.

Historical population

1981: 358
1991: 294
2002: 247

See also
List of places in Serbia
List of cities, towns and villages in Vojvodina

References
Slobodan Ćurčić, Broj stanovnika Vojvodine, Novi Sad, Serbia 1996.

External links
Municipalities of Vojvodina

Populated places in Serbian Banat
Populated places in North Banat District
Novi Kneževac